Miss South Africa 2019 was the 61st edition of the Miss South Africa pageant. It was held on 9 August 2019 at Sun Arena at Time Square in Pretoria, Gauteng. Tamaryn Green of Western Cape crowned her successor Zozibini Tunzi of Eastern Cape at the end of the event. Tunzi represented South Africa in Miss Universe 2019 and was crowned Miss Universe while 1st Runner-Up Sasha-Lee Olivier represented  the country in Miss World 2019.  Olivier assumed the title of Miss South Africa 2019 due to Tunzi winning the Miss Universe title.

Results
Color keys

§ Voted into Top 10 via Internet
∞ After Tunzi was crowned Miss Universe 2019, she resigned her title as Miss South Africa 2019 and Olivier replaced her as the new titleholder.

Contestants
The sixteen finalists were revealed on 11 July.

Non-finalists
The 35 semifinalists were selected from a record 1,886 applicants. Applications were done online, and semifinalists were selected via their social media accounts, as well as online application questions. The semifinalists were later reduced to sixteen finalists following an in-person audition in July 2019.

Judges

Semifinals
Leandie du Randt – actress and motivational speaker
Liesl Laurie – broadcaster and Miss South Africa 2015
Andiswa Manxiwa – former runway model and casting director
Bokang Montjane-Tshabalala – Miss South Africa 2010
Danielle Weakley – Women's Health editor

Finals
Connie Ferguson – Actress and businesswoman
Catriona Gray – Miss Universe 2018 from Philippines
Thando Hopa – Model, activist and lawyer
Anele Mdoda – Radio jockey
Demi-Leigh Nel-Peters – Miss Universe 2017 from South Africa

References 

2019
2019 beauty pageants
 2019 in South Africa
August 2009 events in South Africa